Émile Louis Picault (24 August 1833 – 24 August 1915) was a French sculptor, best known for works depicting allegorical and patriotic subjects, and mythological heroes. Picault was a very prolific artist, producing sculptures in abundance—over 500 models in total—during his long sculpting career.  He began to show his artwork at the Salon beginning in 1863. He signed the majority of his work as "E. Picault".

Works

Bronzes (Salon displayed)
(Source):
 
Le Supplice de Tantale (1867)
Persée délivrant Andromède (1880)
Le Génie du progrès et Nicolas Flamel (1885)
Le Cid (1886)
La Naissance de Pégase (1888)
La Force Domtée
Le Génie des sciences (1894)
Le Génie des arts (1895)
Le Livre (1896)
Le Drapeau "ad unum" (1898)
Vox progressi (1903)
Belléphoron (1906)

Medallions
(Source):

Joseph expliquant les songes du Pharaon (1888)
L'Agriculture (1888)

Plasters
(Source):

Jason (1879)
Andromède (1892)
Prométhée dérobant le feu du ciel (1894)
La Vaillance (1896)
Vertus civiques (1897)
Le Minerai (1902)
La Forge (1905)
Science et Industrie (1909)
Propter gloriam (1914)

Museum exhibitions
(Source):

Picault's work can be seen in museums in the following cities:
Chambéry (Le Semeur d'idées, 45 cm)
Clermont-Ferrand (Hébé, 93 cm)
Maubeuge (Le devoir, Honor patria, 45 cm)
Troyes (La famille, joies et peines)

References

External links
 

1833 births
1915 deaths
20th-century French sculptors
19th-century French sculptors
French male sculptors
19th-century French male artists